Carlos Eduardo Santos Galvão Bueno Filho, better known as Cacá Bueno (born 24 January 1976) is a Brazilian professional racing driver. He competes full-time in the Stock Car Pro Series, driving the No. 0 Chevrolet Cruze for Crown Racing. He is best known for winning the Stock Car Brasil championship five times.

Career
Born in Rio de Janeiro, Bueno started his karting career in 1988 and won the São Paulo states championship in 1992.

His father, Galvão Bueno is a Brazilian sports commentator, very famous in Brazil as the host of the Formula One races, National football team matches and key Brazilian football matches, and friend with Brazilian sport stars. Therefore, Cacá grew up near Brazilian sports idols such as Ayrton Senna.

Although Formula One champion Senna was his idol, Bueno preferred touring car racing and debuted to Stock Car Brasil in 2002. He finished third in his first championship and became vice-champion for three consecutive years (2003–2005).

He won the Stock Car Brasil championship in 2006 at last and became double-champion in 2007. He won the championship again in 2009, 2011 and 2012.

He also has competed in the TC2000, an Argentine touring car series, and ended the 2001 season in 3rd place. In recent years, he competed in the 2007 season in parallel with Stock Car Brasil.

He made his World Touring Car Championship debut for Chevrolet at Brands Hatch. He retired from the first race due to an engine fire, which also stopped him from starting the second race.

In August 2010, Bueno ran a Chevrolet Vectra on the Bonneville Salt Flats at speeds over 340 km/h (~210 mph).

Racing record

Career summary

Stock Car Brasil results

† Did not finish the race, but was classified as he completed over 90% of the race distance.

Complete World Touring Car Championship results
(key) (Races in bold indicate pole position) (Races in italics indicate fastest lap)

Complete FIA GT Series results

Complete Blancpain Sprint Series results

Complete Jaguar I-Pace eTrophy results
(key) (Races in bold indicate pole position)

Personal life
 His brother Paulo Eduardo Popó Bueno is also a racing driver.
 Cacá Bueno supports the Brazilian football team Fluminense.

References

External links
 Cacá Bueno official blog
 Cacá Bueno Bi Campeão – Stock Car

1976 births
Living people
Sportspeople from Rio de Janeiro (city)
Brazilian racing drivers
Stock Car Brasil drivers
TC 2000 Championship drivers
Turismo Carretera drivers
Top Race V6 drivers
Brazilian World Touring Car Championship drivers
Porsche Supercup drivers
Brazilian people of Spanish descent
Blancpain Endurance Series drivers
24 Hours of Spa drivers
International GT Open drivers
Súper TC 2000 drivers
Drivex drivers